Mahima Shani Dev Ki is an Indian Hindi-language Hindu mythological television series that was premiered on 26th July 2008 on Imagine TV.

The show was re-aired on Dangal TV and it also dubbed in Kannada language as Shani Ninna Mahime, and aired on Dum TV Kannada. While the entire episodes of the show is also available on Dangal Play app.

Cast 
 Daya Shankar Pandey as Shani Dev
 Soumik Rao as Chakravarti Vikramaditya, King of Ujjayini
 Namrata Thapa as Madanalekha, Queen of Ujjayini, wife of Vikramaditya
 Nitin Prabhat as Aditya Vardhan, Prince of Ujjayini, son of Vikramaditya
 Bhupinder Singh Bhupi as General Secretary Karang
 Kailash Kaushik as Varaha Mihir
 Jai Shankar Tripathi as Betaal Bhatt
 Sandeep Mohan as Andhra Naresh
 Kanu Patel as Shani Worshiper, Upasak
Dev Joshi as Madhav, Young Shukra
Anwar Fatehan as Raja Chandrasen
Ayam Mehta as Kaka Maharaj, Vikramaditya's brother
Ravi Jhankal as Shani Worshiper
Amit Pachori as Mahadev, Jungalia
Ravi Gossain as Rishi Maandukya
Amit Dolawat as Giridhar
Aditi Sajwan as Maanvi

References

Hindu mythological television series
2008 Indian television series debuts
2009 Indian television series endings